Tender Comrade is a 1943 black-and-white film released by RKO Radio Pictures, showing women on the home front living communally while their husbands are away at war.

The film stars Ginger Rogers, Robert Ryan, Ruth Hussey, and Kim Hunter and was directed by Edward Dmytryk. The film was later used by the HUAC as evidence of Dalton Trumbo spreading communist propaganda. Trumbo was subsequently blacklisted.

The film's title comes from a line in Robert Louis Stevenson's poem "My Wife" first published in Songs of Travel and Other Verses (1896).

Plot
Jo Jones works in an airplane factory and longs for the day when she will see her husband again. The couple have a heart wrenching farewell at the train station before he leaves for overseas duty in the war. With their husbands off fighting in World War II, Jo and her co-workers struggle to pay living expenses. Dissatisfied, they decide to pool their money and rent a house together. Soon after which they hire a German immigrant housekeeper, Manya. Jo discovers she is pregnant and ends up having a son whom she names Chris, after his father. The women are overjoyed when Doris's husband comes home, but the same day Jo receives a telegram informing her that her husband has been killed. She hides her grief and descends the stairs in order to rejoin the homecoming celebration.

Cast
 Ginger Rogers as Jo Jones
 Robert Ryan as Chris Jones
 Ruth Hussey as Barbara Thomas
 Patricia Collinge as Helen Stacey
 Mady Christians as Manya Lodge
 Kim Hunter as Doris Dumbrowski
 Jane Darwell as Mrs. Henderson
 Richard Martin as Mike Dumbrowski

Reception
The film made a profit of $843,000.

References

External links
 
 
 
 

1943 films
1943 drama films
1940s war drama films
American black-and-white films
American war drama films
Films directed by Edward Dmytryk
Films scored by Leigh Harline
Films set on the home front during World War II
Films with screenplays by Dalton Trumbo
RKO Pictures films
American World War II films
1940s English-language films
1940s American films